Shigeru Ota (born 8 January 1967) is a Japanese former professional tennis player.

Ota appeared in four Davis Cup ties for Japan between 1988 and 1990, winning one singles and one doubles rubber. In 1990 he played in one of the longest fifth sets in Davis Cup history, which he and Shuzo Matsuoka lost 16–18 to India's Zeeshan Ali and Leander Paes.

See also
List of Japan Davis Cup team representatives

References

External links
 
 
 

1967 births
Living people
Japanese male tennis players
20th-century Japanese people